U.S. Route 6 (US 6) in the state of Illinois is an east–west arterial surface road that runs  from the city of Moline in the Quad Cities area to Lansing at the Indiana state line.

Route description

Quad Cities to La Salle–Peru
US 6 crosses the I-74 Bridge from Bettendorf, Iowa, south into Moline, concurrent with Interstate 74 (I-74). It remains with I-74 for  until the intersection with I-280 south of the Rock River, where it continues south, then turns east at Quad Cities International Airport. It intersects I-80 as it leaves the Quad Cities area and closely parallels I-80 for the rest of its length in Illinois.

From the Quad Cities, US 6 travels east through the city of Geneseo. At Sheffield, US 6 overlaps US 34 through to Princeton. After an interchange with I-180, US 6 runs with Illinois Route 89 (IL 89) to Spring Valley. In the La Salle–Peru area, US 6 intersects with IL 251, IL 351 and I-39/US 51.

La Salle–Peru to Joliet
Further east, US 6 runs through Marseilles and Seneca, where IL 170 terminates. It then runs through Morris and overlaps IL 47 for a slight northward jog. At Channahon, US 6 has an interchange with I-55.

Joliet to Indiana

In the Joliet area, US 6 parallels the Des Plaines River and passes beneath the cantilever bridge carrying I-80 over the Des Plaines River. At this point, it is called Railroad Street, but it turns onto McDonough Street with US 52 as it crosses the river. It then turns north, overlapping IL 53 (Chicago Street) and then east with US 30 (Cass Street). Two blocks north of leaving US 30, US 6 intersects the southern terminus of IL 171 and turns east onto Maple Road. In New Lenox, it intersects with I-355 and becomes Southwest Highway.

US 6 turns off Southwest Highway in Orland Park, heads north on Wolf Road briefly, then turns east onto 159th Street, a major east–west arterial through that town and the southern suburbs of Chicago. In Calumet City, US 6 joins with IL 83 south to the I-80/I-94 (Kingery Expressway) and then follows the Kingery east into Indiana.

Although US 6 enters the Chicago metropolitan area, it never enters the city limits of Chicago.

History
US 6 first was shown on maps in 1932, mainly on its current routing except for a more southerly routing from Princeton to Spring Valley through DePue and at the Illinois–Indiana line. In 1934, both portions were changed to its current routing, from Princeton to Spring Valley and in Lockport. By 1939, US 6 was rerouted in the Quad Cities, briefly forming US 6 City. By 1953, the route was rerouted to travel along Torrence Avenue and part of the Kingery Expressway (from US 30 Alternate to Indiana state line).

Prior to the formation of US 6, the road west of Princeton was US 32. US 32 remained for several more years until the part east of Princeton became an extension of US 34.

Major intersections

References

External links

06
 Illinois
Transportation in Rock Island County, Illinois
Transportation in Henry County, Illinois
Transportation in Bureau County, Illinois
Transportation in LaSalle County, Illinois
Transportation in Grundy County, Illinois
Transportation in Will County, Illinois
Transportation in Cook County, Illinois